Xoʻjakent is an urban-type settlement in Boʻstonliq District, Tashkent Region, Uzbekistan. Its population is 3,400 (2016). There is a Xoʻjakent Station on the Tashkent-Xoʻjakent Railway.

References

Populated places in Tashkent Region
Urban-type settlements in Uzbekistan